The 1926 New York Yankees season was the team's 24th season. The team finished with a record of 91–63, winning their fourth pennant, finishing three games ahead of the Cleveland Indians. New York was managed by Miller Huggins. The Yankees played at Yankee Stadium. In the World Series, they lost in 7 games to the St. Louis Cardinals, with the series ending with Babe Ruth being caught stealing second in the bottom of the 9th inning in Game 7.

Regular season

Season standings

Record vs. opponents

Roster

Player stats

Batting

Starters by position
Note: Pos = Position; G = Games played; AB = At bats; H = Hits; Avg. = Batting average; HR = Home runs; RBI = Runs batted in

Other batters
Note: G = Games played; AB = At bats; H = Hits; Avg. = Batting average; HR = Home runs; RBI = Runs batted in

Pitching

Starting pitchers
Note: G = Games pitched; IP = Innings pitched; W = Wins; L = Losses; ERA = Earned run average; SO = Strikeouts

Other pitchers
Note: G = Games pitched; IP = Innings pitched; W = Wins; L = Losses; ERA = Earned run average; SO = Strikeouts

Relief pitchers
Note: G = Games pitched; W = Wins; L = Losses; SV = Saves; ERA = Earned run average; SO = Strikeouts

1926 World Series

References
1926 New York Yankees at Baseball Reference
1926 World Series
1926 New York Yankees team page at www.baseball-almanac.com

New York Yankees seasons
New York Yankees
New York Yankees
1920s in the Bronx
American League champion seasons